SDxCentral is a United States based technology journalism and market data research company based in Denver, Colorado.  The company was founded in 2012 as SDNCentral focused on Software Defined Network, and changed its name to SDxCentral in 2015 to reflect its broadened focused on all emerging infrastructure technologies.  The site currently receives over 200,000 unique visitors per month from over 170 different countries.

History
The company, under the name SDNCentral (named for software-defined networking, which was the original intent for the company)  was founded by CEO Matthew Palmer and Roy Chua, the current Chief Product Officer, head of research and co-founder in 2012. the idea for SDNCentral came in 2012 after a Twitter feed focusing on technology news run by Palmer and Chua in 2011 grew popular, and the company changed its focus to market analytics and technology journalism, as a way to educate industry drivers on developments in the field. The company changed its name to SDxCentral in 2017, after changing its website in 2015.

Revenue 
The company also participates in about 20-25 technology and software conventions per year, including the annual Consumer Technology Association consumer electronics show.

References

American technology news websites